The Alfa Romeo GTA is a coupé automobile manufactured by the Italian manufacturer Alfa Romeo from 1965 to 1971. It was made for racing (Corsa) and road use (Stradale).

Giulia GTA

In 1962, the successor for the very popular Giulietta series was introduced. This car was the Alfa Romeo Giulia, internally called the "Series 105". The coupé of the 105 series, used the shortened floorpan from the Giulia Berlina and was designed by Bertone. The name of the car evolved from Giulia Sprint GT to Giulia Sprint and to GTJ (Junior) and GTV (Veloce) in the late 1960s.

At the time, Alfa Romeo was very active in motorsport. Autodelta, the racing division of Alfa, developed a car for competition that closely resembled to the roadgoing model. These cars were named GTA instead of GT, the 'A' standing for "Alleggerita", Italian for lightweight. The GTA automobiles were also manufactured in either street (Stradale) or pure race (Corsa) trim.

The GTA had aluminium outer body panels instead of steel, (the inner steel panels were also of thinner gauge, the inner and outer panels were bonded and pop-riveted together), magnesium alloy wheels, clear plastic side windows, an aluminium rear upper control arm, different door handles and quarter window mechanisms, and lightweight interior trim. The engine had a new double ignition cylinder head (called twin plug, later in the eighties the system was called twin spark) cylinder head with a Marelli distributor from a Ferrari Dino, 2-barrel 45 mm Weber carburetors instead of 40 mm and magnesium camshaft cover, sump, timing cover and bell housing. The transmission gear ratios were closer than standard and the gears were machined for lightness and quicker shifting. The 1600 GTA did not have a brake booster and had a thicker radiator than the standard vehicle. For homologation 500 cars were made for racing and road use.

GTA 1900 and GTA 2000

According to Maurizio Tabucchi (an author of books on Alfa Romeo, consultant at Italian Vintage Automobile Association and at Alfa Romeo Italian Register). The GTA 2000 was a kind of test mule for the GTAm engine. That is the GTAm motor with Lucas injection developing  at 6,500 rpm that was fitted to a GTA 1300 Junior chassis. Tabucchi states that the first outing of these car was at the Tour de Corse in 1969 - this took place November 8–9, 1969. Wheels were 14x7 with Michelin PA2 or TA3 tires. Cars were entered by Autodelta and drivers were Pinto/Santonacci who suffered a puncture and suspension breakage at Guitera. The other team was Barayller/Fayel who suffered clutch breakage.

Tony Adriaensens also reports GTA 2000 race results, albeit later.

Circuit of Benguela, Angola April 10, 1970, Peixinho GTA2000 - 1st overall

Circuit of Cabinda, Angola April 26, 1970, Peixinho - 1st and Bandeira Viera - 2nd, both cars are described as GTA2000

São Paulo, Brazil, May 1–3, 1970, Zambello/Fernandez - 2nd, GTA2000

Interlagos, Brazil, August 9, 1970, Catapani - 1st overall, GTA2000

Nova Lisboa, Angola, August 9–10, 1970 - 6h Intercacionais do Huambo, Fraga/Resende - 2nd place

Santos "Peras"/Flavio Santos car# 8 - 3rd place, both cars are described as GTA 1300 Juniors with 2 liter motor

There are some doubts whether the Brazilian cars were actually 2000cc, as both Zambello and Fernandez are reported to have won events in 1969 with a GTA1900 which is a different  engine, though it can not be ruled out that their car was upgraded to 2000cc for 1970.

GTA 1300 Junior

The GTA 1300 Junior (1968–1975) had a 1300 cc engine that was based on the 1600 engine but with a short stroke crankshaft. The GTA Junior in stradale form did not have many of the light weight features of the 1600 GTA, such as the plastic windows, magnesium engine components and alloy wheels. Autodelta prepared fuel injected racing cars had . 450 GTA Juniors were produced.

GTAm

The 1750 GTAm (later called 2000 GTAm when the 2000 GTV was introduced) was created in 1969. There are two schools of thought about the "Am" moniker, neither one ever having been officially confirmed by Alfa Romeo: one expands Am to Alesaggio Maggiorato (Italian: increased bore), the other Alleggerita Modificata (Italian: lightened Modified). The car had a full steel body modified with aluminium and / or plastic parts. The base for the GTAm was the 1750 GTV with a SPICA mechanical fuel injection system. The majority of the genuine GTAm's built by Autodelta have a chassis number starting with 105.51.XXXXXX. The European market 1750 GTV with dual carburettors from Dell'Orto or Weber carburetor and chassisnumbers starting with 105.44.XXXXXX was also used as a base. The same goes for the 2000 GTV and the 1300 GT Junior bodyshell that was lighter. Note that some racing teams and private workshops ordered the parts from Autodelta and other tuners and assembled the cars themselves on a new or existing bodyshell. According to the sources, some 40 GTAm's were built by Autodelta and by private workshops. This number is difficult to verify as the GTAm's didn't have their own specific chassis number series. In the second revised edition of the book `Alleggerita` (written by Tony Adriaensens & Patrick Dasse), published in 2012 by Dingwort Verlag,

GTA-SA

The Giulia 1600 GTA-SA (sovralimentato ) (1967–1968) was a very rare racing car, which only 10 were built. The GTA-SA was built for FlA Group 5 racing in Europe and it won first place overall in the Hockenheim 100 mile endurance race in 1967 in the hands of the German driver Siegfried Dau. In the Netherlands, Rob Slotemaker and Nico Chiotakis also drove GTA-SA.

Racing success

Both types, the GTA/ GTA 1300 Junior and the GTAm were very successful, and these cars were driven to numerous victories. In the opening season at Monza, they won the first seven places. Andrea de Adamich claimed the ETCC title in 1966.  The GTA won the European Touring Car Championship (ETCC) also in 1967 and 1968.  The later Alfa Romeo GTAm won further ETCC titles in 1970 and 1971

The 1750 GTAm and the 2000 GTAm cars were driven to victory by Toine Hezemans, who won the 24 hours of Francorchamps with this car. These cars won hundreds of races before competition grew stronger in 1971. But the Giulia sometimes kept up with much bigger engined cars such as the 3 litre BMW CSL.

In the USA the GTA's first racing victory was in January 1966 at the “Refrigerator Bowl”, at the now defunct Marlboro Raceway in Maryland, with Monty Winkler and Pete Van der Vate at the wheel.  The Autodelta GTA of Horst Kwech and Gaston Andrey won the Under 2 litre class of the inaugural Sports Car Club of America's Trans-Am championship in 1966. Horst Kwech also won the first SCCA National B-Sedan ARRC Championship in the same GTA in 1966. The GTA would also go on to win the 1970 championship.

Technical data

Modern GTAs
The designation GTA was used in the 2000s for the highest performance road-going versions of the 156 and 147. These cars are powered by 3.2 litre Busso V6 engines giving them the most power of the cars in the model range, however despite the GTA name, they are generally the heaviest cars in the range, due to having large engines and little if any weight saving employed in their construction. For example, the 147 GTA weighs .

147 GTA
The 147 GTA was introduced in 2002 as the top-end hatchback model for Alfa Romeo. It is powered by a 3.2 litre V6, derived from the 164 from the early 90s. It is a two-door hatchback that seats five, and is characterized by its wider wheel arches, teledial 17 inch wheels, and more aggressive grille design.

156 GTA
This four-door saloon was available in sedan or wagon versions.

MiTo GTA
The MiTo GTA prototype has a 1.75 litre, turbocharged straight-4, producing . However, due to the economic downturn in 2008/2009, the Mito GTA was never produced.

Giulia GTA and GTAm
A limited edition version with 500 units of the new Giulia introduced in 2020, Giulia GTA.

See also
Alfa Romeo 105/115 Series Coupés
Alfa Romeo in motorsport
Alfa Romeo in Formula One
Alfa Corse

References

Sources

External links
 History of the European Touring Car racing championship—Cars and results
 Giulia GTA, GTA 1300 JUnior, and GTAm (1965-1975) section at Alfa Romeo Bulletin Board

GTA
Coupés
Rear-wheel-drive vehicles
1970s cars
Cars introduced in 1965
Group 4 (racing) cars